İhsan Lâtif Sökmen, also known as Ali İhsan Pasha (1873–1955) was a Turkish soldier and politician who is notable for his participation in World War I.

Biography
After graduating from the Military Academy in 1895, he took part in the Greco-Turkish War and the Balkan Wars. He served as the Military Attaché in Athens, the Chief of Staff of the Yemen Army Corps, the Commander of the Edremit Division, and the Commander of the Mus Division. When World War I began Caucasus Front's 9th Corps in carrying out the tasks Sarikamish battle during the Russian army fell prisoners on 22 December 1914, and was exiled to Siberia. He managed to escape from Siberia in May 1915 and returned to Istanbul in September 1915 through China, Japan, the United States and Greece. He retired in October 1915.

He served as Istanbul Şehremaneti Yeniköy Mayor and Pursaklar Inspector. He returned to active duty in 1919. He was appointed as the Head of the Divan-ı War and War Department. In the same year, he was appointed as the Head of Association for Defence of National Rights, a secret organization, by the Ankara Government. In this capacity, he ensured that weapons and ammunition were sent to Anatolia. Sökmen was honored with Medal of Independence with Red Stripe for Achievement.

After the Turkish War of Independence, he served as the Izmir Housing District Manager for a short time, and was appointed to the Izmir Governor's Office in 1924. He was elected as Istanbul deputy in the second parliamentary by-elections in 1926. He served as a deputy for Istanbul between 1927 and 1931 and Giresun between 1931 and 1946. IV. Period National Defense Committee Chief, V. and VI. Period Arzuhal Committee Headship, VI. and VII. He served as the Chairman of the Library Committee.

He was married and had two children.

Works
Serencam-i Harp
Iran's Military and its Policy

References

1873 births
1955 deaths
Ottoman Army generals
Turkish Army generals
Ottoman military personnel of the Balkan Wars
Ottoman military personnel of World War I
Turkish military personnel of the Turkish War of Independence
Recipients of the Medal of Independence with Red Ribbon (Turkey)